The Uniform Commercial Code (UCC), first published in 1952, is one of a number of Uniform Acts that have been established as law with the goal of harmonizing the laws of sales and other commercial transactions across the United States through UCC adoption by all 50 states, the District of Columbia, and the Territories of the United States.

While largely successful at achieving this ambitious goal, some U.S. jurisdictions (e.g., Louisiana and Puerto Rico) have not adopted all of the articles contained in the UCC, while other U.S. jurisdictions (e.g., American Samoa) have not adopted any articles in the UCC. Also, adoption of the UCC often varies from one U.S. jurisdiction to another. Sometimes this variation is due to alternative language found in the official UCC itself. At other times, adoption of revisions to the official UCC contributes to further variation. Additionally, some jurisdictions deviate from the official UCC by tailoring the language to meet their unique needs and preferences. Lastly, even identical language adopted by any two U.S. jurisdictions may nonetheless be subject to different statutory interpretations by each jurisdiction's courts.

Goals
The goal of harmonizing state law is important because of the prevalence of commercial transactions that extend beyond one state. For example, goods may be manufactured in State A, warehoused in State B, sold from State C, and delivered in State D. The UCC achieved the goal of substantial uniformity in commercial laws and, at the same time, allowed the states the flexibility to meet local circumstances by modifying the UCC's text as enacted in each state. The UCC deals primarily with transactions involving personal property (movable property) and not real property (immovable property).

Other goals of the UCC were to modernize contract law and to allow for exceptions from the common law in contracts between merchants.

History

The UCC is the longest and most elaborate of the Uniform Acts. The Code has been a long-term, joint project of the National Conference of Commissioners on Uniform State Laws (NCCUSL) and the American Law Institute (ALI). NCCUSCL and ALI began drafting the first version of the UCC in 1945, following earlier, less comprehensive codification efforts for areas including the sale of goods across state lines.

Judge Herbert F. Goodrich was the chairman of the editorial board of the original 1952 edition, and the Code itself was drafted by legal scholars including Karl N. Llewellyn (the prime leader in the project), William A. Schnader, Soia Mentschikoff, and Grant Gilmore. The UCC contained principles and concepts borrowed from German law, although they were unacknowledged by Llewellyn.

The Code, as the product of private organizations, is not itself the law, but only a recommendation of the laws that should be adopted in the states. Once enacted by a state, the UCC is codified into the state's code of statutes. A state may adopt the UCC verbatim as written by ALI and NCCUSL, or a state may adopt the UCC with specific changes. Unless such changes are minor, they can seriously obstruct the Code's express objective of promoting uniformity of law among the various states. Thus, persons doing business in various states must check local law.

The ALI and NCCUSL have established a permanent editorial board for the Code. This board has issued a number of official comments and other published papers. Although these commentaries do not have the force of law, courts interpreting the Code often cite them as persuasive authority in determining the effect of one or more provisions. Courts interpreting the Code generally seek to harmonize their interpretations with those of other states that have adopted the same or a similar provision.

In one or another of its several revisions, the UCC has been fully enacted with only minimal changes in 49 states, as well as in the District of Columbia, Guam, the Northern Mariana Islands, and the U.S. Virgin Islands. Louisiana and Puerto Rico have enacted most of the provisions of the UCC with only minimal changes, except Articles 2 and 2A, preferring instead to maintain their own civil law tradition for governing the sale and lease of goods. Also, some Native American tribes have adopted portions of the UCC, including the Navajo Nation, which has adopted Articles 1, 2, 3, and 9 with only minimal changes.

Although the substantive content is largely similar, some states have made structural modifications to conform to local customs. For example, Louisiana jurisprudence refers to the major subdivisions of the UCC as "chapters" instead of articles, since the term "articles" is used in that state to refer to provisions of the Louisiana Civil Code.  Arkansas has a similar arrangement as the term "article" in that state's law generally refers to a subdivision of the Arkansas Constitution.  In California, they are titled "divisions" instead of articles, because in California, articles are a third- or fourth-level subdivision of a code, while divisions or parts are always the first-level subdivision.  Also, California does not allow the use of hyphens in section numbers because they are reserved for referring to ranges of sections; therefore, the hyphens used in the official UCC section numbers are dropped in the California implementation.

UCC articles 
The 1952 Uniform Commercial Code was released after ten years of development, and revisions were made to the Code from 1952 to 1999.
The Uniform Commercial Code deals with the following subjects under consecutively numbered Articles:

In 2003, amendments to Article 2 modernizing many aspects (as well as changes to Article 2A and Article 7) were proposed by the NCCUSL and the ALI.  Because no states adopted the amendments and, due to industry opposition, none were likely to, in 2011 the sponsors withdrew the amendments.  As a result, the official text of the UCC now corresponds to the law that most states have enacted. 

In 1989, the National Conference of Commissioners on Uniform State Laws recommended that Article 6 of the UCC, dealing with bulk sales, be repealed as obsolete.  Approximately 45 states have done so.  Two others have followed the alternative recommendation of revising Article 6.

A major revision of Article 9, dealing primarily with transactions in which personal property is used as security for a loan or extension of credit, was enacted in all states.  The revision had a uniform effective date of July 1, 2001 although in a few states it went into effect shortly after that date.  In 2010, NCCUSL and the ALI proposed modest amendments to Article 9.  Several states have already enacted these amendments, which have a uniform effective date of July 1, 2013.

The controversy surrounding with what is now termed the Uniform Computer Information Transactions Act (UCITA) originated in the process of revising Article 2 of the UCC.  The provisions of what is now UCITA were originally meant to be "Article 2B" on Licenses within a revised Article 2 on Sales.  As the UCC is the only uniform law that is a joint project of NCCUSL and the ALI, both associations must agree to any revision of the UCC (i.e., the model act; revisions to the law of a particular state only require enactment in that state).  The proposed final draft of Article 2B met with controversy within the ALI, and as a consequence the ALI did not grant its assent.  The NCCUSL responded by renaming Article 2B and promulgating it as the UCITA.  As of October 12, 2004, only Maryland and Virginia have adopted UCITA.

The overriding philosophy of the Uniform Commercial Code is to allow people to make the contracts they want, but to fill in any missing provisions where the agreements they make are silent.  The law also seeks to impose uniformity and streamlining of routine transactions like the processing of checks, notes, and other routine commercial paper.  The law frequently distinguishes between merchants, who customarily deal in a commodity and are presumed to know well the business they are in, and consumers, who are not.

The UCC also seeks to discourage the use of legal formalities in making business contracts, in order to allow business to move forward without the intervention of lawyers or the preparation of elaborate documents.  This last point is perhaps the most questionable part of its underlying philosophy; many in the legal profession have argued that legal formalities discourage litigation by requiring some kind of ritual that provides a clear dividing line that tells people when they have made a final deal over which they could be sued.

Article 2 
Article 2 deals with sales, and Article 2A deals with leases.

Contract formation 
 Firm offers (offers to buy or sell goods and promising to keep the offer open for a period of time) are valid without consideration if signed by the offeror, and are irrevocable for the time stated on the purchase order (but no longer than three months), or, if no time is stated, for a reasonable time.
 An offer to buy goods for "prompt shipment" invites acceptance by either prompt shipment or a prompt promise to ship. Therefore, this offer is not strictly unilateral. However, this "acceptance by performance" does not even have to be by conforming goods (for example, incomplete sets).
 Consideration—modifications without consideration may be acceptable in a contract for the sale of goods.
 Failure to state price—In a contract for the sale of goods, failure to state a price will not prevent the formation of a contract if the parties' original intent was to form a contract. A reasonable price will be determined by the court.
 Assignments—a requirements contract can be assigned, provided the quantity required by the assignee is not unreasonably disproportionate to the original quantity.

Contract repudiation and breach 
 Nonconforming goods—If non-conforming goods are sent with a note of accommodation, such tender is construed as a counteroffer, and if accepted, forms a new contract and binds the buyer at previous contract price. If the seller refuses to conform and the buyer does not accept, the buyer must return all non conforming goods at sellers expense within thirty days of receipt.
 Perfect tender—The buyer however does have a right of "perfect tender" and can accept all, reject all, or accept conforming goods and reject the rest; within a reasonable time after delivery but before acceptance, he must notify the seller of the rejection. If the buyer does not give a specific reason (defect), he cannot rely on the reason later, in legal proceedings (akin to the cure before cover rationale). Also, the contract is not breached per se if the seller delivered the non-conforming goods, however offensive, before the date of performance has hit.
 "Reasonable time/good faith", four weeks' minimum lead time, standard—Such standard is required from a party to a contract indefinite as to time, or made indefinite by waiver of original provisions.
 Requirements/Output contracts—The UCC provides protection against disproportionate demands, but must meet the "good faith" requirement.
 Reasonable grounds for insecurity—In a situation with a threat of non-performance, the other part may suspend its own performance and demand assurances in writing. If assurance is not provided "within a reasonable time not exceeding 30 days", the contract is repudiated.
 Battle of forms—New terms will be incorporated into the agreement unless:
 the offer is limited to its own terms, 
 they materially alter the original terms (limit liability etc.),  
 the first party objects to new terms in a timely manner, or the first party has already objected to new terms. Whether the new terms "materially alter" the original offer may depend on the nature of the item (e.g. a delay in delivery of nails is not the same as for fish).
 Battle of forms—A written confirmation of an offer sent within a reasonable time operates as an acceptance even though it states terms that are additional to or different from those offered, unless acceptance is expressly made conditional to the additions.
 Statute of frauds as applicable to the sale of goods—The actual contract does not need to be in writing. Just some note or memo must be in writing and signed. However, the UCC exception to the signature requirement is where written confirmation is received and not objected to within 10 days.
 Cure/cover—The buyer must give the seller time to cure the defective shipment before seeking cover.
 FOB place of business—The seller assumes risk of loss until the goods are placed on a carrier. FOB destination: the seller assumes risk of loss until the shipment arrives at its destination. If the contract leaves out the delivery place, it is the seller's place of business.
 Risk of loss—Equitable conversion does not apply. In the sale of specific goods, the risk of loss lies with the seller until tender. Generally, the seller bears risk of loss until the buyer takes physical possession of the goods (the opposite of realty).
 Reclamation—Successful reclamation of goods excludes all other remedies with respect to the goods. The seller can reclaim goods upon demand within 20 days after the buyer receives them if the seller discovers that the buyer received the goods while insolvent.
 Rightfully rejected goods—A merchant buyer may follow reasonable instructions of the seller to reject the goods. If no such instructions are given, the buyer may make a reasonable effort to sell them, and the buyer/bailee is entitled to 10% of the gross proceeds.
 Implied warranty of fitness—Implied warranty of fitness arises when the seller knows the buyer is relying upon the seller's expertise in choosing goods. Implied warranty of merchantability: every sale of goods fit for ordinary purposes. Express warranties: arise from any statement of fact of promise.
 UCC damages for repudiating/breaching seller—Difference between 1) the market price when the buyer learned of breach and the 2) contract price 3) plus incidental damages. An aggrieved seller simply suing for the contract price is economically inefficient.
 Specially manufactured goods—Specially manufactured goods are exempt from statute of frauds where manufacturer has made a "substantial beginning" or "commitments for the procurement" of supplies.

Section 2-207: Battle of the forms

One of the most confusing and fiercely litigated sections of the UCC is Section 2-207, which Professor Grant Gilmore called "arguably the greatest statutory mess of all time". It governs a "battle of the forms" as to whose boilerplate terms, those of the offeror or the offeree, will survive a commercial transaction where multiple forms with varying terms are exchanged. This problem frequently arises when parties to a commercial transaction exchange routine documents like requests for proposals, invoices, purchase orders, and order confirmations, all of which may contain conflicting boilerplate provisions.

The first step in the analysis is to determine whether the UCC or the common law governs the transaction. If the UCC governs, courts will usually try to find which form constitutes the offer. Next, the offeree's acceptance forms bearing the different terms is examined. One should note whether the acceptance is expressly conditional on its own terms. If it is expressly conditional, it is a counteroffer, not an acceptance. If performance is accepted after the counteroffer, even without express acceptance, under 2-207(3), a contract will exist under only those terms on which the parties agree, together with UCC gap-fillers.

If the acceptance form does not expressly limit acceptance to its own terms, and both parties are merchants, the offeror's acceptance of the offeree's performance, though the offeree's forms contain additional or different terms, forms a contract. At this point, if the offeree's terms cannot coexist with the offeror's terms, both terms are "knocked out" and UCC gap-fillers step in. If the offeree's terms are simply additional, they will be considered part of the contract unless (a) the offeror expressly limits acceptance to the terms of the original offer, (b) the new terms materially alter the original offer, or (c) notification of objection to the new terms has already been given or is given within a reasonable time after they are promulgated by the offeree.

Because of the massive confusion engendered by Section 2-207, a revised version was promulgated in 2003, but the revision has never been enacted by any state.

Article 8

The ownership of securities is governed by Article 8 of the Uniform Commercial Code (UCC). This Article 8, a text of about 30 pages, underwent important recasting in 1994. That update of the UCC treats the majority of the transfers of dematerialized securities as mere reflections of their respective initial issue held primarily by two American central securities depositories, respectively The Depository Trust Company (DTC) for securities issued by corporations and the Federal Reserve for securities issued by the Treasury Department. In this centralised system, the title transfer of the securities does not take place at the time of the registration with the issuer's registrar for the account of the investor, but within the systems managed by DTC or by the Federal Reserve.

This centralization is not accompanied by a centralized register of the investors/owners of the securities, such as the systems established in Sweden and in Finland (so-called "transparent systems"). Neither DTC nor the Federal Reserve hold an individual register of the transfers of property reflecting beneficial owners. The consequence for an investor is that proving ownership of its securities relies entirely on the accurate replication of the transfer recorded by DTC and FED and others in the intermediated holding system at the lower tiers of the holding chain of the securities. Each one of these links is composed respectively of an account provider (or intermediary) and of an account holder.

The rights created through these links are purely contractual claims: these rights are of two kinds:

 For the links where the account holder is itself an account provider at a lower tier, the right on the security during the time where it is credited there is characterized as a "securities entitlement", which is an "ad hoc" concept invented in 1994: e.g., designating a claim that will enable the account holder to take part to a prorate distribution in the event of bankruptcy of its account provider.
 For each link of the chain, in which the final account holder is at the same time the final investor, its "security entitlement" is enriched by the "substantial" rights defined by the issuer: the right to receive dividends or interests and, possibly, the right to take part in the general meetings, when that was laid down in the account agreement concluded with the account provider. The combination of these reduced material rights and of these variable substantial rights is characterised by article 8 of the UCC as a "beneficial interest".

This decomposition of the rights organized by Article 8 of the UCC results in preventing the investor to revindicate the security in case of bankruptcy of the account provider, that is to say the possibility to claim the security as its own asset, without being obliged to share it at its prorate value with the other creditors of the account provider. As a consequence, it also prevents the investor from asserting its securities at the upper level of the holding chain, either up to DTC or up to a sub-custodian. Such a "security entitlement," unlike a normal ownership right, is no longer enforceable "erga omnes" to any person supposed to have the security in its custody. The "security entitlement" is a mere relative right, therefore a contractual right.

This re-characterization of the proprietary right into a simple contractual right may enable the account provider to "re-use" the security without having to ask for the authorization of the investor. This is especially possible within the framework of temporary operations such as security lending, option to repurchase, buy to sell back or repurchase agreement. This system the distinction between the downward holding chain which traces the way in which the security was subscribed by the investor and the horizontal and ascending chains which trace the way in which the security has been transferred or sub-deposited.

Contrary to claims suggesting that Article 8 denies American investors their security rights held through intermediaries such as banks, Article 8 has also helped US negotiators during the negotiations of the Geneva Securities Convention, also known as the Unidroit Convention on Substantive Rules for Intermediated Securities.

Article 9

Article 9 governs security interests in personal property as collateral to secure a debt. A creditor with a security interest is called a secured party.

Fundamental concepts under Article 9 include how a security interest is created (called attachment); how to give notice of a security interest to the public, which makes the security interest enforceable against others who may claim an interest in the collateral (called perfection); when multiple claims to the same collateral exist, determining which interests prevail over others (called priority); and what remedies a secured party has if the debtor defaults in payment or performance of the secured obligation.

Article 9 does not govern security interests in real property, except fixtures to real property. Security interests in real property include mortgages, deeds of trusts, and installment land contracts. There may be significant legal issues around security interests in Bitcoin.

The obligee which is the debtor shall return all assets stated in the collateral to secured party after the perfection of default by secured party in response to protest by the Obligee within specified time frame in the civil code and UCC Article 9-3.

The Model Tribal Secured Transactions Act (MTSTA) is a model act written by the Uniform Law Commission (ULC) and tailored to provide Native American tribes with a legal system to govern secured transactions in Indian country.  It was derived from the UCC, primarily Article 9.

International influence
Certain portions of the UCC have been highly influential outside of the United States. Article 2 had some influence on the drafting of the United Nations Convention on Contracts for the International Sale of Goods (CISG), though the end result departed from the UCC in many respects (such as refusing to adopt the mailbox rule). Article 5, governing letters of credit, has been influential in international trade finance simply because so many major financial institutions operate in New York. Article 9, which established a unified framework for security interests in personal property, directly inspired the enactment of Personal Property Security Acts in every Canadian province and territory except Quebec from 1990 onwards. This was followed by New Zealand's Personal Property Securities Act 1999 and the Australian Personal Property Securities Act of 2009.

See also

 UCC-1 financing statement
 Uniform Commercial Code adoption
 United States contract law
 Codification
 Commercial law
 Uniform act
 United Nations Convention on Contracts for the International Sale of Goods (CISG)
 Convention on the Limitation Period in the International Sale of Goods
 Incoterms
 Certified Commercial Contracts Manager (CCCM) professional certification in contract management offered by the National Contract Management Association (NCMA) and specifically covering the UCC

Notes

References

Sources

External links
Uniform Commercial Code (UCC) at Legal Information Institute (LII)
Research Guide and Introduction to the UCC from Duke University Law School
State of Michigan UCC Book
Permanent Editorial Board for the UCC (ALI)
Permanent Editorial Board for the UCC (NCCUSL)

 
1952 in law
Commercial
Economy of the United States
United States contract law